Parsa's, trading as Parsa's - Food For All, is an Indian fast food chain headquartered in Srinagar, Jammu and Kashmir, India. It was founded in 2017 by Javid Parsa. Parsa's currently operates at number of locations across Jammu & Kashmir and Ladakh as well as in few major cities in India. It has 26 outlets throughout India.

Parsa's is the largest food chain in Jammu & Kashmir. It is multi-cuisine and primarily sells Kathi rolls. The menu features both vegetarian and non- vegetarian products. It also serves Biryani, pulao, desserts, salads, and beverages.  Besides that, it also serves Wazwan at its selected outlets.

History 
The restaurant chain opened its first outlet in Srinagar, Jammu and Kashmir, India in October 2017. Parsa's headquarters are located in the Sarah City Centre, Srinagar.

Outlets 
Parsa's outlets can be found in Srinagar as well as other regions of India's Jammu and Kashmir, like Baramulla, Budgam, Ganderbal, Pulwama, Bhaderwah, Jammu, Shopian, Kargil, Awantipora, Sopore,Pampore, Tral, Handwara. as well as in Leh, Delhi, Bangalore, Pune.  Parsa's recently opened its outlet in Handwara, J&K. Parsa's also plans to expand in other regions of India.

Book Bank 
Parsa's hosts a collection of books of different genres donated by readers. Javid Parsa, in order to promote the reading culture across the valley, started Parsa Book Bank in 2015 to help the youth to inculcate reading habits in the times of internet and social media. Visitors to the Parsa outlets can read and borrow the books from the bank. Apart from it, Parsa Book Bank also hosts books launches of indigenous authors.

See also 

 Indian fast food
 Indian cuisine
 Kashmiri cuisine
 List of fast food restaurant chains
 Fast food restaurant

References 

Fast food
Indian fast food
Fast-food chains of India
Indian cuisine
Kashmiri cuisine
Srinagar